1993 saw many sequels and prequels in video games, such as Dragon Ball Z: Super Butōden, Mortal Kombat II, Secret of Mana, and Super Street Fighter II, along with new titles such as Disney's Aladdin, Doom, FIFA International Soccer, Gunstar Heroes, NBA Jam, Ridge Racer, Samurai Shodown, Star Fox and Virtua Fighter.

The year's highest-grossing video game worldwide was Capcom's arcade fighting game Street Fighter II for the third year in a row, while again being the year's highest-grossing entertainment product. The year's best-selling home system worldwide was the Sega Mega Drive/Genesis video game console.

Top-rated games

Game of the Year awards
The following titles won Game of the Year awards for 1993.

Famitsu Platinum Hall of Fame
The following video game releases in 1993 entered Famitsu magazine's "Platinum Hall of Fame" for receiving Famitsu scores of at least 35 out of 40.

Financial performance

Highest-grossing arcade games
Street Fighter II was the highest-grossing entertainment product of 1993, earning more than the film Jurassic Park. The following table lists the year's top-grossing arcade games in Japan, the United Kingdom, United States, and worldwide.

Japan
The following titles were the top ten highest-grossing arcade games of 1993 in Japan.

United States
In the United States, NBA Jam was the highest-grossing arcade game of 1993, followed by Mortal Kombat; both games exceeded the  domestic box office gross of Jurassic Park that year.

The following titles were the highest-grossing arcade video games of the year, according to the Amusement & Music Operators Association (AMOA) and American Amusement Machine Association (AAMA).

Best-selling home systems

Consoles

Computers

Best-selling home video games 
The following titles were the top ten best-selling home video games (console games or computer games) of 1993 with known sales figures.

Japan
In Japan, the following titles were the top ten best-selling home video games of 1993.

Europe
In Europe, the following titles were the top two best-selling 1993 releases during the first quarter of the year.

In the United Kingdom, the following titles were the top ten best-selling home video games of 1993.

United States
In the United States, the following titles were the top two highest-grossing home video game franchises in 1993.

The following titles were the best-selling home video games of each month for video game consoles (home consoles and handheld consoles) in 1993, according to Babbage's (reported by Electronic Gaming Monthly and Electronic Games), Mega (for the Sega Genesis in January), and The NPD Group (for the Super NES and Genesis in July).

The following titles were the year's top six best-selling PC games on CD-ROM format in the United States.

Events
 March – In Sweden, the Swedish video game magazine Super Play (SP) starts. The original name is Super Power.
 March 1 – The book Game Over by David Sheff, devoted to the history of Nintendo, is published by Random House.
 May 11 – The first FuncoLand location in McHenry County, Illinois opens in Crystal Lake, bringing the chain's total number of locations to 62.
 August 4 – FuncoLand parent company Funco Inc. leases space for new locations in six shopping centers in the New York City area.
 October 1 – Nintendo and Silicon Graphics collaborate and begin work on "Project Reality".
 December 7 – The first of two congressional hearings on video games takes place. Topics for discussion include the depiction of violence and sexual content in video games, their influence on children, and the prospect of governmental regulation of video game content.

Business
New companies: Croteam, nVidia, Take-Two Interactive, Shiny
Defunct companies: DK'Tronics, Epyx
Magnavox is acquired by the Carlyle Group
MicroProse is acquired by Spectrum HoloByte

Notable releases

Arcade

Home

Hardware
Sega releases the Model 2, an arcade system board that introduces 3D texture filtering. It becomes their most popular arcade system board.
Fujitsu releases the FM Towns Marty in Japan, as the first 32-bit home console, starting the fifth console generation.
Panasonic, GoldStar and Sanyo release the first versions of the 3DO 32-bit console
Atari Corporation releases the Jaguar home console, calling it the first 64-bit video game system.
Commodore Business Machines releases the Amiga CD32 multimedia home console.
Nintendo releases a smaller redesigned NES, which allows cartridges to be inserted at the top of the console, instead of the front.
Pioneer releases the LaserActive multimedia home console
Sega's Mega-CD released in Europe and Australia.

See also
1993 in games

References

1993 in video gaming
Video games by year